The Kingdom of Dardania was a polity in the central Balkans in the region of Dardania during classical antiquity. It is named after the Dardani, a Paleo-Balkan tribe that formed the core of the Dardanian polity. Dardania was centered around present-day Kosovo, but also included parts of North Macedonia     (Gostivar), Serbia (Novi Pazar) and Albania (Kukës). The eastern parts of Dardania were at the Thraco-Illyrian contact zone. Marcus Licinius Crassus, grandson of the triumvir Marcus Crassus, officially annexed the kingdom in 28 BC while on campaign against the Dacians and Bastarnae. The region was subsequently incorporated into the province of Moesia in 15 BC, and later in 293 AD, as the province of Dardania.

History 
Tribal aristocracy and pre-urban development first emerged in Dardania from the 6th–5th centuries BC. This proto-urban development was followed by the creation of urban centers and the emergence of craftsmanship, and a Dardanian polity began to develop from the fourth century. Moreover, Dardani contact with the Mediterranean world began early and intensified during the Iron Age. Trade connections with the Ancient Greek world developed from the seventh century onwards. Material culture and accounts in classical sources suggest that Dardanian society reached an advanced phase of development.

The first written references to the Dardani are as opponents of Macedon in the fourth century, clashing with Philip II who managed to subdue them and their neighbors in 345. However, Philip took no new territory and ended Macedon’s borders near the Danube watershed in Paeonia. The Dardani then remained quiet until Philip's assassination in 336, after which they began planning to revolt alongside the Illyrians and the Thracians. The first century historian Pompey Trogue reports that these ‘’barbarous nations…were of wavering faith and perfidious dispositions’’ and that only Alexander III’s smooth succession averted disaster. Indeed, the Dardani are not mentioned in any ancient accounts of Alexander's Balkan campaign in 335. They remain absent from our sources until 284 when Lysimachus seized Paeonia, which had revolted earlier in 322, forcing her prince Ariston to flee to Dardania. It appears that the Dardani escaped the Macedonian yoke entirely during the Wars of the Diadochi as they again began to freely raid Upper Greece under the reign of Lysimachus. Thereafter the Dardani became a constant threat to Macedonia's northern borders.

In 279, during a Celtic incursion of the Balkans, Dardania itself began to be raided by several tribes on their way to plunder Greece. In that same year an unnamed Dardanian king offered 20,000 warriors to the Macedonian king Ptolemy Ceraunus to stop the invading Celts. Ptolemy found this offer insulting and rudely refused the embassy by saying that the Macedonians were in a sad condition if, after having subdued the whole east without assistance, they now required aid from the Dardanians to defend their country; and that he had for soldiers the sons of those who had served under Alexander the Great, and had been victorious throughout the world.Underestimating the Celtic strength, Ptolemy was later captured in battle and subsequently decapitated by their Gallic leader Bolgios. The tribes then pushed on towards Southern Greece, but were permanently turned back at Delphi by the Greeks. The remainder withdrew north through Dardania where they were, according to Diodorous, subsequently destroyed by the Dardani. They then disappear from the written historical record until the 230s BC when a constant series of wars, raids, and counter-raids began against the Macedonians.

Following the Celtic invasion, and the consequent diminishment in power of the Macedonians, the influence of Dardania began to grow in the region. In 

230, the Dardani under Longarus captured the strategic city of Bylazora in Paeonia. At some point in 230-229 in an unknown location in north-west Macedonia, they defeated the Antigonid king Demetrius II who died shortly the next spring. The Dardanian expansion into Macedonia, similar to the Ardiaean expansion into Epirus in the same period, may have been part of a broader movement among the Illyrian peoples.

Groups of Illyrians began to desert the Ardiaen queen Teuta at around the same time and join the Dardani, forcing her to end an expedition into Phoenice. When Philip V rose to the Macedonian throne, skirmishing with Dardania began in 220-219 and he managed to recapture Bylazora from them in 217. Skirmishes continued in 211 and in 209 when a force of Dardani under Aeropus, probably a pretender to the Macedonian throne, captured Lychnidus and looted Macedonia taking 20.000 prisoners and retreating before Philip's forces could reach them.

In 201, Bato of Dardania (along with Pleuratus the Illyrian and Amynander, King of Athamania) cooperated with Roman consul Sulpicius Galba Maximus in his expedition against Philip V. Always being under the menace of Dardanian attacks on Macedonia, Philip V made an alliance with the Bastarnae at around 183 and invited them to settle in Polog, the region of Dardania closest to Macedonia. A joint campaign of the Bastarnae and Macedonians against the Dardanians was organized, but Philip V died and his son Perseus of Macedon withdrew his forces from the campaign. The Bastarnae crossed the Danube in huge numbers and although they didn't meet the Macedonians, they continued the campaign. Some 30,000 Bastarnae under the command of Clondicus seem to have defeated the Dardani. In 179, the Bastarnae conquered the Dardani, who later in 174 pushed them out, in a war which proved catastrophic, with a few years later, in 170, the Macedonians defeating the Dardani. Macedonia and Illyria became protectorates of the Roman Republic in 168. The Dardanian Kingdom retained its sovereignty until 28 BC, when the Roman Empire under Augustus conquered the region.

The Romans created the province of Moesia from parts of Dardania, but later made it a separate province called Dardania.

Geography

Sites in Kosovo

Culture 

The eastern parts of the region were at the Thraco-Illyrian contact zone. In archaeological research, Illyrian names are predominant in western Dardania (present-day Kosovo), while Thracian names are mostly found in eastern Dardania (present-day south-eastern Serbia). Thracian names are absent in western Dardania; some Illyrian names appear in the eastern parts. The correspondence of Illyrian names, including those of the ruling elite, in Dardania with those of the southern Illyrians suggests a "thracianization" of parts of Dardania. Strabo in his geographica mentions them as one of the three strongest Illyrian peoples, the other two being the Ardiaei and Autariatae.

Dardanian rulers 
Unnamed Dardanian king (early 3rd century BC), who offered the Macedonian king Ptolemy Ceraunos 20,000 soldiers to counteract the invading Celts, but Ceraunos declined the offer.
Longarus;
Bato
Monunius II
According to a historical reconstruction the first attested Dardanian king was Bardylis, who during the expansion of his dominion included the region of Dassaretis in his realm, but this is considered an old fallacy because it is unsupported by any ancient source, while some facts and ancient geographical locations go squarely against it. Most scholars hold that the Illyrian kingdom that was established by Bardylis was centered along Lake Ohrid and east to the Prespa Lakes, which was called Dassaretis later in Roman times, located on the border between Macedon and Epirus.

See also 
Dardani
Archaeology of Kosovo

Notes

References

Bibliography 

 

 

Dardanians
Dardania (Roman province)
Illyrian tribes
Thracian tribes
Moesia
Former kingdoms